Chandmari is one of the oldest localities of Guwahati, Assam, India. Situated towards the eastern side of the city. It is home to All India Radio, Guwahati centre and a couple of academic institutions such as Holy Childs Convent, Bhaskar Bidyapith Higher Secondary School, Near Guwahati Commerce College Gauhati Commerce College, Assam Engineering Institute to name a few. Many high schools and degree colleges are set up in this area adding to its educational atmosphere. This part of city is also known for its recreational facilities. Bohag Bihu (Rongali Bihu) is regularly organized  since 1961 at the A.E.I. playground which is also known as Chandmari Bihutoli by Pub Guwahati Bihu Sanmilan. Durga Puja is also regularly celebrated at Chandmari by the Chandmari Sarbajanin Durga Puja Committee. The neighboring residential areas around Chandmari are Milonpur, Nizarapar, Bamunimaidam, Kannachal, Pub-Sarania, Bhaskar Nagar etc. The area has one of the oldest movie theatres 'Anuradha' showing national and international movies.

See also
 Patharquerry
 Rehabari

References

Neighbourhoods in Guwahati